Sajóbábony is a town in Borsod-Abaúj-Zemplén County in northeastern Hungary.

References

External links

  in Hungarian

Populated places in Borsod-Abaúj-Zemplén County